Deadpool v. Gambit, also known as Deadpool vs. Gambit, is an American comic book series published by Marvel Comics, featuring Deadpool and Gambit as its main protagonists. The story explores the characters' pre X-Men relationship, and is another in a series of limited print runs where Deadpool battles another character from the Marvel Universe. The series lasted 5 issues, from August 2016 to November 2016, and was written by Ben Acker and Ben Blacker with art from Danilo Beyruth.

Publication history 
Deadpool v. Gambit is part of a line of Deadpool-oriented limited series, which includes Deadpool vs. X-Force (2014), Deadpool vs. Carnage (2014), Hawkeye vs. Deadpool (2014-2015), Deadpool vs. Thanos (2015), and Deadpool vs. The Punisher (2017). Marvel announced the miniseries at the 2016 conference of the Comics Professional Retail Organization, the trade organization for comic book specialty shops. The series' creation was influenced by the release of the Deadpool film, which was then enjoying box office and critical success, a Gambit film that was in development, and of the then recently-released Batman v Superman: Dawn of Justice, of which the title of Deadpool v. Gambit is in reference to. The series made frequent use of some lesser known characters, especially from the Iron Fist franchise, and Acker noted that "It's just as fun to elevate lesser-known characters as it is to bring popular characters down to our level." Blacker mentioned that they had submitted a proposal for a Deadpool v. Gambit ongoing series, which he anticipated being approved in early 2017.

Reception 
The series holds a 7.5 out of 10 on comics review aggregator Comic Book Roundup, indicating generally favorable reviews. User reviews, which are not required to submit comments alongside the scores, give the comic a 6.8 out of 10, indicating mixed reviews. The first two comics were poorly received, with scores of 5.9 and 5.2 for #1 and #2 respectively, but issues #3 and #4 had scores of 8.5 and 7.5.

Critics generally praised the art of Beyruth, but were critical of the writing and the structure of the story. Mark Hassenfratz of ComicsVerse said that he had low expectations of the series due to Deadpool's "overexposure" after the release of his solo movie, but indicated that he enjoyed the first issue "way more" than he thought he would. John McCubbin of Snap Pow called the first issue "strange and muddled" and lacking focus, but also said he believed the first issue "showed some promise, even if it came during the last page."

Sales 
The series remained in the Diamond Comic Distributors Top 100 Comics list for its entire publication run. The first issue peaked at 37th for overall sales in June 2016, with a dollar ranking of 28th, selling an estimated 65,773 issues.  The series fell in rank during the publication's run, and its lowest point was 79th in August 2016 with 38,173 issues, though the final issue did move back up to 75th.

References

External links
Preview at /Film
Review at Inverse
Newsarama article

Deadpool titles
Marvel Comics titles
2016 in comics